Cissa of Crowland was a saint in the medieval Fenlands. He was the successor of Guthlac as abbot of Crowland, and is mentioned in Felix' Vita Guthlaci. According to the Crowland Chronicle his tomb was next to Guthlac's, and like the tomb of Guthlac, was destroyed by the Scandinavians. His relics were translated to Thorney Abbey in the 10th-century.

Notes

References

External links
 

8th-century Christian saints
East Anglian saints
Mercian saints